Pilot Rock is a prominent volcanic plug located in the western Cascade Range near the east end of the Siskiyou Mountains, just east of the Siskiyou Summit near Ashland, Oregon. At 25.6 million years old, it is one of the oldest formations of the Cascade Range. The rock is protected by the Cascade–Siskiyou National Monument and the Soda Mountain Wilderness. Several trails pass near Pilot Rock, including the Pacific Crest Trail.

Geology
It was created when andesitic magma broke through a weak spot in the Earth's crust and solidified beneath the surface, forming a plug. The softer rock around the plug slowly eroded away, leaving Pilot Rock as it is seen today. Similar features include Devils Tower in Wyoming and Shiprock in New Mexico. Argon–argon dating shows that the rock is approximately 25.6 million years old, making it one of the oldest volcanic formations in the Cascades, but much younger than the 425 million-year-old Siskiyou Mountains nearby.

Pilot Rock has a large amount of columnar jointing, created when the magma cooled. The joints are tilted about 20 degrees to the east due to the gradual uplift of the Siskiyou Mountains to the west. The rock also has an unusually high amount of black hornblende crystals, indicating that there was a significant amount of water in the area when it formed. Extensive talus deposits have accumulated around the rock's base. The surrounding soil is primarily the sticky, eroded remnants of volcaniclastic breccia.

History
The Takelma tribe of Native Americans originally called the rock Tan-ts'at-seniphtha (stone standing up), but to early settlers Pilot Rock was known as Boundary Mountain. The United States Exploring Expedition passed through the area on September 28, 1841, renaming the rock Emmons Peak after Lieutenant George F. Emmons, a U.S. naval officer and member of the group. Emmons described the rock as "a singular, isolated rock, which stands like a tower on the top of the ridge, rising above the surrounding forest with a bare and apparently unbroken surface." James Clyman also described the rock when he passed through the area on June 26, 1845.

Nine planes have crashed into Pilot Rock since 1942, mainly due to poor visibility.

Pilot Rock is protected by the Cascade–Siskiyou National Monument, created in 2000, and the Soda Mountain Wilderness, created in 2009.

Flora
Pilot Rock is located in the eastern Klamath Mountains ecoregion and is surrounded by dense mixed coniferous forest. Wildflowers such as wild strawberries, larkspur, columbine, lupine, and paintbrush grow in the spring and summer. Gentner's fritillary, a rare species of the lily family, has been found growing on and near the rock.

Trails

The left branch is the northbound continuation of the Pacific Crest Trail, while the right fork is the summit trail. At the summit, there are views of landmarks such as Mount Shasta, the Trinity Alps, and Mount McLoughlin.

See also

Roxy Ann Peak
Upper and Lower Table Rock

References

Rock formations of Oregon
Landforms of Jackson County, Oregon
Volcanic plugs of the United States
Oligocene volcanoes
Oligocene North America
Paleogene geology of Oregon